Jamarion Sharp (born August 26, 2001) is an American college basketball player for the Western Kentucky Hilltoppers of the Conference USA (C-USA). He previously played for the John A. Logan Volunteers. At , he is the tallest current Division I player and is one of the tallest living humans.

Early life and high school career
Sharp was born on August 26, 2001. He admits that "growing up, [he] didn’t love the game of basketball". Sharp's future high school coach, Tim Haworth, who knew him since he was five years old, encouraged him to play.

Sharp had a growth spurt the summer after middle school and came into Hopkinsville High School as a  freshman. He played basketball for the Tigers, where he appeared in the KHSAA Sweet Sixteen state tournament as a sophomore. As a junior, he averaged a modest 2.9 points and three rebounds per game. As a senior, he averaged 7.6 points and 7.9 rebounds per game, leading the Tigers to a 16–14 record and an 8th district semifinals appearance. He earned all-district honors and was selected to represent Team Kentucky in the 2019 Kentucky-Indiana All-Star game.

Western Kentucky head coach Rick Stansbury noticed Sharp, then a junior, in February 2018 while scouting another player. He caught Stansbury's attention during pre-game warm-ups but did not play in the first half. After Stansbury inquired about "the big kid", Haworth worked Sharp out in front of him at halftime by having him shoot jump hooks. Sharp was offered a scholarship "basically that night". However, he did not meet the academic requirements to attend Western Kentucky, his dream school, out of high school. On April 23, 2019, Sharp committed to John A. Logan College, a junior college (JUCO) in Carterville, Illinois.

College career

John A. Logan
He averaged 5.5 points, five rebounds and 3.7 blocks per game in his first year, earning All-Great Rivers Athletic Conference (GRAC) honors. While teaming with Jay Scrubb, they led the Volunteers to a 28–5 record and finished undefeated in conference play for the first time in school history. On January 28, 2021, Sharp recorded 20 points, 10 rebounds and six blocks in a double-overtime victory over Three Rivers. He recorded two triple-doubles in February against Kaskaskia College and Southwestern Illinois, including a season-high 12 blocks in the latter. As a sophomore, Sharp averaged 7.7 points, 7.3 rebounds and 5.3 blocks per game, earning All-GRAC and all-region honors.

Sharp was rated a four-star prospect and the top JUCO recruit in the nation by 247Sports. He received offers from programs such as Arizona, Cincinnati and Oregon, but committed to Western Kentucky on November 23, 2020.

Western Kentucky
In his first game as a Hilltopper, an exhibition against Campbellsville, he recorded 14 points, seven rebounds and three blocks in 17 minutes. Sharp said of the experience that it was "amazing to play for [his] dream school." On November 24 he earned his first start in a 88–62 victory against Alabama A&M after Jaylen Butz was sidelined with knee soreness. In just his fifth game, he contributed 10 points, 12 rebounds, and 10 blocks, recording the third triple-double in program history and setting the program single-game blocks record. On December 4, he recorded 17 points, 14 rebounds and four blocks in a 85–80 victory over in-state rivals Eastern Kentucky. On December 11, he recorded 16 points, nine rebounds and six blocks in a 71–48 victory over Ole Miss at the Holiday Hoopsgiving in Atlanta. On December 18, he had 14 points, eight rebounds and four blocks in their 82–72 win over Louisville – the Hilltoppers' first win over the Cardinals since 2008. In their next game against Kentucky, he recorded eight points, six rebounds and seven blocks in the first half before exiting the game with an ankle sprain. 

Sharp finished the season with averages of 8.3 points, 7.5 rebounds and a nation-leading 4.6 blocks per game while shooting 72.7 percent from the field. His 148 blocks set a new single-season program record, surpassing Chris Marcus's 97 blocks in 2000–01. Sharp was named Conference USA Defensive Player of the Year and an honorable mention all-conference selection. He was a semifinalist for the Naismith Defensive Player of the Year Award, as well as a finalist for the Lefty Driesell Award.

Career statistics

College

|-
| style="text-align:left;"| 2019–20
| style="text-align:left;"| John A. Logan
| 33 || 13 || – || .641 || .000 || .380 || 5.0 || .2 || .3 || 3.7 || 5.5
|-
| style="text-align:left;"| 2020–21
| style="text-align:left;"| John A. Logan
| 24 || 16 || – || .559 || .500 || .582 || 7.3 || .7 || .2 || 5.8 || 7.7
|- class="sortbottom"
| style="text-align:center;" colspan="2"| Career
| 57 || 29 || – || .598 || .333 || .486 || 6.0 || .4 || .3 || 4.6 || 6.5

References

External links
Western Kentucky Hilltoppers bio
John A. Logan Volunteers bio

2001 births
Living people
American men's basketball players
Basketball players from Kentucky
Centers (basketball)
John A. Logan Volunteers men's basketball players
People from Hopkinsville, Kentucky
Western Kentucky Hilltoppers basketball players